The 21st congressional district of Ohio was a congressional district in the state of Ohio. It was eliminated in the redistricting following the 1990 census.

In its last decade, the district consisted of a large portion of eastern Cuyahoga county.

List of members representing the district

Election results

Bold type indicates victor. Italic type indicates incumbent.

References

 Congressional Biographical Directory of the United States 1774–present

External links 
 1983 District Maps of Ohio - United States Congress, Ohio Senate, Ohio House of Representatives, Ohio Court of Appeals, Sherrod Brown, Secretary of State

21
Former congressional districts of the United States
Constituencies established in 1843
1843 establishments in Ohio
Constituencies disestablished in 1993
1993 disestablishments in Ohio